Monoraphidium is a genus of green algae in the family Selenastraceae.

Description 
Monoraphidium has a straight to lunate to sigmoid or helically shaped cell. They are 2-182 by 1-8 micrometers.

References

External links

Sphaeropleales genera
Sphaeropleales